State Route 45 (SR 45) is a state highway in the U.S. State of California that travels in a north–south direction in the Sacramento Valley from Route 113 in Knights Landing to Route 32 in Hamilton City.

Route description

The route begins at SR 113 in Knights Landing in Yolo County. It then heads northward and enters Colusa County, where it has a short overlap with SR 20. It then enters Glenn County, where it overlaps SR 162 through the cities of Codora and Glenn. It then continues northward to its end at SR 32 in Hamilton City.

SR 45 is part of the California Freeway and Expressway System, but is not part of the National Highway System, a network of highways that are considered essential to the country's economy, defense, and mobility by the Federal Highway Administration.

Major intersections

See also

References

External links

Caltrans: Route 45 highway conditions
California Highways: SR 45
California @ AARoads.com - State Route 45

045
State Route 045
State Route 045
State Route 045